The three Chester-class cruisers were the first United States Navy vessels to be designed and designated as fast "scout cruisers" for fleet reconnaissance. They had high speed but little armor or armament. They were authorized in January 1904, ordered in fiscal year 1905, and completed in 1908. In 1920 all scout cruisers were redesignated as "light cruisers" (CL).

The class patrolled the Caribbean prior to World War I, sometimes supporting military interventions, with Chester playing a key role at the start of the United States occupation of Veracruz in 1914. The ships escorted convoys in World War I. The class was decommissioned 1921-1923 and sold for scrap to comply with the limits of the London Naval Treaty in 1930.

Design and construction

Ship type

The three Chesters were the US Navy's only ships to be commissioned with the "scout cruiser" (hull classification symbol non-standard at the time, CS or SCR are sometimes used) designation, and were characterized by high speed and little armor or armament. They were also the last cruisers of any type built for the US Navy until the first  cruisers were laid down in 1917 (the Navy concentrated on building dreadnought battleships and destroyers in the interim). The first three Omaha-class ships were also designated "scout cruisers" (CS or SCR) when ordered, but before any were launched the Navy revised its classification system and they and the Chesters became "light cruisers" (CL).

Armament

The as-built armament included two /50 caliber Mark 6 guns, six /50 caliber rapid fire (RF) guns, and two 21 inch (533 mm) torpedo tubes. The original design featured a uniform gun armament of twelve 3-inch guns, which was supported by the Navy's General Board as simplifying fire control and echoing the uniform main and secondary armaments of dreadnought battleships. However, two 5-inch guns were substituted for six of the 3-inch guns, apparently to enable the scout cruisers to fight foreign light cruisers. Notably, for the first time in US cruiser design smaller caliber weapons (6-pounder and smaller) were not fitted.

Armor

The armor of these ships was very light. There was no protective deck, only a  deck above the steering gear.

Engineering

The three ships had different propulsion plants so they could be compared: Chester was the first major combatant in the USN to receive steam turbine propulsion of the Parsons type, Salem received Curtis turbines, and Birmingham traditional triple-expansion engines.

Chester had twelve coal-fired Normand boilers and Parsons direct-drive steam turbines totaling  on four shafts. She made  on trials at an estimated .

Birmingham had twelve coal-fired Fore River boilers supplying  steam to two four-cylinder vertical triple-expansion engines totaling  (design) on two shafts.

Salem had twelve coal-fired Fore River boilers and Curtis direct-drive steam turbines totaling  (design) on two shafts.

Normal coal capacity was 475 tons, which could be increased to 1,400 tons.

Refits

All three ships were refitted in 1917 to prepare for service in World War I. Salem had her main engines replaced with a  General Electric geared steam turbine installation due to high coal consumption. All three received an armament upgrade, with four new /51 caliber guns replacing the 5-inch/50 caliber guns as well as two of the 3-inch/50 caliber , two 3-inch/50 caliber single-purpose guns (four being removed), and two 3-inch/50 caliber anti-aircraft guns added. The submerged torpedo tubes were retained.

Ships in class

The three ships of the Chester class were:

On 17 July 1920 these ships were reclassified with the new hull numbers CL-1 through CL-3 (light cruisers).

See also
 List of cruisers of the United States Navy

References

Bibliography

External links

Cruiser Photo Gallery Index at NavSource Naval History

Cruiser classes